Rangrik Rang is a mountain in the Kinnaur district of Himachal Pradesh in India.

Location 
The peak can be found to the north of the upper Sanglatals. The Eastern and Western Racho Khad ice masses feed on the upper east and northwest flanks of Rangrik Rang, respectively, and support the northbound Tirang.

Climbing history 
The peak was summited on 20 June 1994 through the northeast ridge by an Indo-British expedition team. The team consisted of the following members; Chris Bonington, Jim Fotheringham, Muslim Contractor, Graham Little, Divyesh Muni, Jim Lowther, Paul Nunn, and Pasang Bodh.

References 

Six-thousanders of the Himalayas